Chicken Rice War is a Singaporean romantic comedy film released in 2000 by Raintree Pictures. It is an adaptation of Romeo and Juliet in a Singaporean setting, where fierce competition between rival chicken rice hawkers resulted in bitter enmity. The old feud between chicken rice hawker families' stand in the way of their young offspring who fell for one another.

Synopsis
Chicken Rice War is loosely based on William Shakespeare's Romeo and Juliet. In this movie the Montagues and Capulets are represented by the families Wong and Chan. Both families run Chicken Rice stalls side by side in the same market, something that the authorities say is impossible, since it is not allowed. The underlying conflict is about the secret family recipes that has been kept secret for generations, but apart from that nobody really knows what the fight is about.

Audrey Chan is a beautiful, vain and spoilt girl who is the most popular girl in school. Fenson Wong is an insecure young man with a stutter who, of course, is madly in love with Audrey. Their only common interest is Shakespeare and the version of Romeo and Juliet that they are setting up at school. When Fenson gets the chance to replace Audrey's beautiful but dim boyfriend as Romeo he starts seriously dreaming about capturing Audrey's heart.

Cast
	Pierre Png	 ... 	Fenson Wong
	May Yee Lum	 ... 	Audrey Chan
	Catherine Sng	 ... 	Wong Ku
	Gary Yuen	 ... 	Vincent Chan
	Kevin Murphy	 ... 	Leon Deli
	Kelvin Ng	 ... 	Sydney Wong
	Su Ching Teh	 ... 	Penelope Chan
	Wui Seng Cheong	 ... 	Wong Terr
	Irene Ong	 ... 	Wendy Chan
	Weng Kee Lee	 ... 	Chan Tick
	Gary Loh	 ... 	Muscle Mike
	Jo Jo Struys	 ... 	Cheryl
	Randall Tan	 ... 	Nick Carter
	Zalina Abdul Hamid	 ... 	Fat Lady
	Mohan Sachden	 ... 	Muthiah
	Alias Kadir	 ... 	Ahmad
	Edmund L. Smith	 ... 	Mr. Pillay
	Paul Tan	 ... 	TV presenter
	Tanya Chua	 ... 	Herself
	Jonathan Lim	 ... 	Hugo A Go Goh
	Uttsada Panichkul	 ... 	Himself
	Kevin Poh	 ... 	Capulet
	Jamie Yeo	 ... 	Herself

Awards
 Discovery Award at the 2001 Toronto International Film Festival
 Special Jury Award Miami Film Festival 2002[<ref>"Awards"
 Nominee Best Film Buenos Aires International Festival of Independent Cinema 2002[<ref>"Awards"

References

External links

Singaporean romantic comedy films
2000 films
2000s Cantonese-language films
2000s English-language films
Films based on Romeo and Juliet